The 2003 Football Conference play-off Final took place on 10 May 2003 and was contested between Dagenham & Redbridge and Doncaster Rovers. It was held at the Britannia Stadium, Stoke-on-Trent and was the inaugural final of the Football Conference playoffs which were introduced to accommodate a second promotion place to the Football League.

Match

Summary
Doncaster had much of the play early on in the match with Tony Roberts in the Daggers goal making a number of good saves, notably from Paul Barnes. Doncaster turned up the pressure and should have taken the lead through Steve Foster, whose header was cleared off the line by John McGrath. However they took a deserved lead when Tim Ryan's cross was headed into the net by Paul Green.

Ten minutes into the second half Doncaster were two goals in front thanks to Dave Morley's header, which a Dagenham defender got an inadvertent hand to, with the ball rebounding in off the post. Dagenham battled on and got a goal back through Mark Stein, who netted after a knock down from target man Steve West. They then levelled the scores when Tarkan Mustafa scored arguably the goal of the game. He received a good ball from Paul Terry on the right, ran at the Rovers defence and shot past Andy Warrington into the far corner of the net.

Extra time was needed and, with legs tiring, it was Doncaster who got the golden goal. Paul Barnes broke away on the left and crossed for Francis Tierney, who sidefooted home to send his team back into the Football League. It is the only time in UK football that promotion has been decided by the controversial golden goal method, officially known as "Promotion Goal" in this match. The pitch was subsequently invaded by Doncaster Rovers fans, including one wearing an oversized jester's hat who managed to circle the ground before being caught by police.

Details

References

Play-off Final
Play-off Final 2003
Play-off Final 2003
National League (English football) play-off finals
Conference Playoff Final 2003
Football Conference play-off Final